William Paul Colton (born 13 March 1960), known as Paul Colton, is an Irish Anglican bishop. Since 1999, he has served as Bishop of Cork, Cloyne and Ross in the Church of Ireland.

Biography

Paul Colton attended St Luke's National School, Douglas, Cork, Cork Grammar School and Ashton Comprehensive School, Cork, before being awarded a scholarship to the Lester B. Pearson United World College of the Pacific, Victoria, British Columbia, Canada, where he completed the International Baccalaureate in 1978. He studied law at University College, Cork (part of the National University of Ireland) and was the first graduate of the university to be elected to a bishopric in the Church of Ireland.  He studied theology at Trinity College Dublin. In 1987 he completed the degree of Master in Philosophy (ecumenics) at Trinity College, Dublin, and a Master of Laws at Cardiff University in 2006. His LLM thesis was on the subject of legal definitions of church membership. In 2013 he completed, and was conferred with, a PhD in law also at Cardiff University. His academic areas of interest are: church law, the law of the Church of Ireland, law within Anglicanism, the interface between the laws of religious communities and the laws of States (particularly in Ireland and Europe), human rights, education law, and charity law.  In 2014 he was appointed as an honorary research fellow at Cardiff Law School of Cardiff University, and its Centre for Law and Religion.

He was consecrated bishop at Christ Church Cathedral, Dublin, on Thursday 25 March 1999—the Feast of the Annunciation.  He was enthroned in St. Fin Barre's Cathedral, Cork on 24 April 1999, in St Colman's Cathedral, Cloyne on 13 May 1999, and in St. Fachtna's Cathedral, Ross on 28 May 1999.

He officiated at the wedding of footballer David Beckham and Spice Girl Victoria Adams on 4 July 1999 at the medieval Luttrellstown Castle on the outskirts of Dublin.

He is married to Susan Colton, who was deputy principal of a primary school until her retirement in 2022 and they have two adult sons.

He was the first Church of Ireland bishop to openly support same-sex marriage.

He is involved in education debates and in charity work. He chairs the board of directors of Saint Luke's Charity, Cork, which focuses on the elderly and dementia sufferers. He is also chairman of the board of governors of Midleton College.

At the episcopal ordination of Bishop Fintan Gavin as Catholic bishop of Cork and Ross in June 2019, Colton presented the crozier at Bishop Gavin's own request.

As of  June 2020, Colton is the longest-serving bishop of Cork Cloyne and Ross since bishop William Lyon in 1617  and also the longest serving bishop still in office in the Anglican churches of Ireland, England, Scotland and Wales.

On 27 February 2022, Colton was the invited preacher at the Patronal Eucharist in Lichfield Cathedral, to mark the 1,350th anniversary of the death of Saint Chad.

Publications
Colton is the author of almost a dozen book chapters, mostly in the area of the interface between religion and law.

Ecclesiastical career 
 Curate of Lisburn St. Paul (Connor) 1984 – 1987
 Bishop's Domestic Chaplain (Connor) 1985 – 1990
 Vicar Choral Belfast Cathedral (St. Anne) 1987 – 1990
 Minor Canon Belfast Cathedral ( St. Anne) 1989 – 1990
 Incumbent of Castleknock and Mulhuddart with Clonsilla (Dublin) 1990 – 1999
 Priest Vicar, registrar and Chapter Clerk of Christ Church Cathedral, Dublin 1990 – 1995
 Rural Dean of St. Mary's (Dublin) 1994 – 1999
 Canon of Christ Church Cathedral, Dublin 1997 – 1999
 Chairman Connor Youth Council 1986 – 1990
 Member of Interchurch Marriages Preparation Course 1991 – 1998
 Co-ordinator of Religious Programmes involving the Protestant Churches at Raidió Teilifís Éireann (RTÉ) 1993 – 1999
 Hon. Chaplain, Actors Church Union 1994 ~ 1997 Area Chaplain (Ireland) 1996 – 1997
 Member of Central Committee, Conference of European Churches 1992 – 1997
 Church of Ireland Representative at the Porvoo Conversations and Porvoo Communion Contact Group 1989 – 1999
 Secretary of the Church of Ireland General Synod 1999
 Research Associate at the Centre for Law and Religion, Cardiff Law School, Cardiff University, 2006
 Member of the General Committee of the Ecclesiastical Law Society, 2006 – 2012
 Honorary Research Fellow at Cardiff University Law School, 2014

References

External links
 Sermon at Lichfield Cathedral for 1,350th anniversary of the death of Saint Chad (from 28.48 onwards)

1960 births
Living people
Alumni of Trinity College Dublin
Bishops of Cork, Cloyne and Ross
People educated at a United World College
People educated at Cork Grammar School
Alumni of Cardiff University
Clergy from Cork (city)